The Story of God with Morgan Freeman is an American television documentary series that premiered on the National Geographic Channel on April 3, 2016. The series features actor Morgan Freeman who explores various cultures and religions, and their take on religion-related topics, particularly about their belief in a God or a higher power. Freeman previously portrayed God in the films Bruce Almighty and Evan Almighty. The second season began airing on January 16, 2017. In January 2018, it was announced that the series had been renewed for a third season, which began a year later on March 5, 2019.

Episodes

Series overview

Season 1 (2016)

Season 2 (2017)

Season 3 (2019)

Home releases

References

External links

 
 

2010s American reality television series
2016 American television series debuts
English-language television shows
National Geographic (American TV channel) original programming
American religious television series